Mary Dumont is an American chef based in Boston, Massachusetts.

Biography
Dumont has made appearances on The Today Show and Iron Chef America (competing against Cat Cora) and is the former chef of Harvest in Cambridge, Massachusetts, where she is known for creating innovative dishes.

Before joining the kitchen at Harvest, Dumont was the founder and executive chef of The Dunaway Restaurant at Strawbery Banke in Portsmouth, New Hampshire and was named Best New Chef by Food & Wine magazine in 2006 while there.

In September 2021, along with Pat McAuley opened PlantPub in Cambridge, Massachusetts where the motto is “Eat. plants. Drink. Beer.” (McAuley is a craft beer entrepreneur) they teamed up with Matthew Kenney Cuisine to open a location across from Fenway Park.  Dumont opened Cultivar in 2017.

Early life
Born in Lowell, Massachusetts, she grew up in Portsmouth, New Hampshire.  Dumont's training included working in the kitchens of Tracy Des Jardins of Jardinière, Laurent Manrique of Campton Place and Daniel Patterson of Elizabeth Daniel, all in San Francisco.

Personal life
Dumont is openly lesbian, and is married to her wife, Emily French-Dumont.  Dumont graduated from Simmons College.

References

Year of birth missing (living people)
LGBT chefs
Living people
American women chefs
Iron Chef contestants
21st-century LGBT people
Chefs from New Hampshire
Simmons University alumni